Kenneth George Viljoen (14 May 1910 – 21 January 1974) was a South African cricketer who played in 27 Test matches from 1930–31 to 1948–49. He was later a manager of post–World War II South African teams. He was born in Windsorton, Cape Province, and died in Krugersdorp, Transvaal.

References

1910 births
1974 deaths
Free State cricketers
Gauteng cricketers
Griqualand West cricketers
South Africa Test cricketers
Afrikaner people
South African people of Dutch descent
South African cricketers